Going Blank Again is the second studio album by English rock band Ride, released on 9 March 1992 on Creation Records. It was produced by Alan Moulder, and peaked at No. 5 in the UK Albums Chart. In October 2009 the album was certified gold by the British Phonographic Industry for sales of over 100,000 units.

Background and production
Following Ride's 1990 debut album Nowhere, Ride released Going Blank Again as their second full-length record, accompanied by the singles "Leave Them All Behind" (10 February 1992) and "Twisterella" (13 April 1992), the latter named in reference to a song in the 1963 kitchen sink drama Billy Liar. The album consists of ten tracks, selected from twenty-five that the band had recorded.

It has been said that Going Blank Again resembles the band's debut album but also drawing comparisons to the power-pop style of Teenage Fanclub who were Creation Records labelmates of Ride, although it is pointed out that Ride's vocals are more layered, and that the guitars are not as sharp and cutting as those of similar bands of the same era, whilst retaining the reverberating sound that was typical of the shoegaze sound. The album's lyrics have been criticised, but overall this was not seen as an important factor for the album given the nature of shoegaze.

The band credit Christopher Gunson with creating the cover art for the album.

Release
The album was re-released on 24 September 2001 featuring four bonus tracks on the Ignition label in the United Kingdom. The four tracks were compiled from the two CD singles released from the album, "Leave Them All Behind" and "Twisterella". This omitted the original mix of "Chrome Waves", as found on the "Leave Them All Behind" CD single in February 1992 and the "Grasshopper" compilation EP in Japan in November of that year. On 30 March 2012, a 20th Anniversary reissue of the album was announced, featuring the same track listing as the 2001 reissue, plus a bonus DVD of the band's 27/3/92 Brixton Academy concert, previously only released on VHS and LaserDisc, which had been out of print. According to a recent newsletter to fans, tracking down the original master of the video was no easy task:

After quite a lengthy stint of detective work, we managed to track down the original digital master tape of the Brixton live show. And it looks great! So we asked Catherine Marks and John Catlin at Alan Moulder’s studio to mix the audio afresh from the 2″ master tapes of the gig. Catherine had worked under Alan’s watchful eye on the Roxy LA mixes and so we were really happy that she could find time to mix and edit the Brixton audio. Needless to say, it sounds truly wonderful and we’re really pleased to now finally have a Ride release on DVD.

Going Blank Again was re-issued in November 2022 by Wichita recordings. All the original audio reworked and refined, the reissue made available on vinyl and CD.

Reception

Reviewing the album at the time, British music weekly NME noted that they did not have high hopes for Going Blank Again but that Ride "did the business" and restored the magazine's faith in the band, noting particularly that they had taken on board a diverse set of influences and developed their sound:

This LP has some top punk rock bass guitar on it! Some new effects pedals! New ideas! It is not Going Nowhere Again which is the album we feared they'd make. Instead, GBA fills in the lines between Ride's beauty with cement and then builds like a demon. There is no stone left unturned, as they open up to new reference points... would you believe King Crimson? New Order? The Who? The Beach Boys? Ride have reinvented themselves whilst retaining all the cuteness of Haircut One Hundred.

An academic study on My Bloody Valentine's seminal shoegazing album Loveless mentions that the tracks of Going Blank Again are "predictive" of later genres of indie rock, and notes that the seventh track "Cool Your Boots" is a "shoegazing classic". "Leave Them All Behind" ranked number 273 in NME's list of The 500 Greatest Songs of All Time, whilst the album itself ranked at number 407 in the corresponding greatest albums list published a year earlier.

Track listing
All songs composed by Andy Bell, Loz Colbert, Mark Gardener, Steve Queralt.

Additional tracks

Charts

Certifications

Release history

References

External links
Going Blank Again at YouTube (streamed copy where licensed)

1992 albums
Albums produced by Alan Moulder
Creation Records albums
Ride (band) albums
Sire Records albums